Landrada of Austrasia (died ca. 690) was an abbess who is venerated as a Catholic, Orthodox and True Orthodox including Tikhonite saint. She is credited with the foundation of Munsterbilzen Abbey (Belgium), where, in 2006, 10 massive oak trunk graves were discovered, one of which is believed to have been hers. She died in Munsterbilzen about A.D. 690.

References

690 deaths
Benedictine abbesses
Benedictine saints
7th-century Frankish saints
Belgian Roman Catholic saints
Christian abbesses
Year of birth unknown
Founders of Catholic religious communities
Frankish abbesses
Christian female saints of the Middle Ages
7th-century Frankish nuns